Rivero Island (Spanish Isla Rivero) is an island in the Chonos Archipelago of Chile.

See also
 List of islands of Chile

External links
 UN

Chonos Archipelago

es:Archipiélago de los Chonos#Isla Rivero